Tony Simms (born 16 February 1959) is a Canadian basketball player. He competed in the men's tournament at the 1984 Summer Olympics.

References

External links
 

1959 births
Living people
Basketball players at the 1984 Summer Olympics
Boston University Terriers men's basketball players
Black Canadian basketball players
Canadian expatriate basketball people in Spain
Canadian expatriate basketball people in the United States
Canadian men's basketball players
1982 FIBA World Championship players
1990 FIBA World Championship players
New York Knicks draft picks
Olympic basketball players of Canada
Jamaican emigrants to Canada
Shooting guards
Sportspeople from Kingston, Jamaica
CB Estudiantes players